USS Andrew Jackson may refer to

, was a revenue cutter launched in 1832 and sold in 1865
, was a submarine commissioned in 1963 and decommissioned in 1989

See also 
 USS Jackson (disambiguation)

United States Navy ship names